The Croatian Water Polo Federation (HVS) is the governing body of water polo in Croatia. It is based in Zagreb.

League system

It also organizes the Croatian Cup of Water Polo as well as the Croatian national water polo team and the Croatian national junior water polo team.

Water polo first came to Croatia in 1908. The HVS was formed on May 21, 1971 in Split.

In 2004 Perica Bukić was elected as president of the federation.

External links 
 Croatian Water Polo Federation
  Proslavimo 100 godina vaterpola na splitskim Bačvicama (100 years of waterpolo in Croatia)

Water polo in Croatia
Croatia
Water polo